In enzymology, a hyoscyamine (6S)-dioxygenase is an enzyme that catalyzes the chemical reaction

L-hyoscyamine + 2-oxoglutarate + O2  (6S)-hydroxyhyoscyamine + succinate + CO2

The 3 substrates of this enzyme are L-hyoscyamine, 2-oxoglutarate, and O2, whereas its 3 products are (6S)-hydroxyhyoscyamine, succinate, and CO2.

This enzyme belongs to the family of oxidoreductases, specifically those acting on paired donors, with O2 as oxidant and incorporation or reduction of oxygen. The oxygen incorporated need not be derived from O2 with 2-oxoglutarate as one donor, and incorporation of one atom o oxygen into each donor.  The systematic name of this enzyme class is L-hyoscyamine,2-oxoglutarate:oxygen oxidoreductase ((6S)-hydroxylating). Other names in common use include hyoscyamine 6beta-hydroxylase, hyoscyamine 6beta-dioxygenase, and hyoscyamine 6-hydroxylase.  This enzyme participates in alkaloid biosynthesis ii.  It has 2 cofactors: iron,  and Ascorbate.

References 

 

EC 1.14.11
Iron enzymes
Ascorbate enzymes
Enzymes of unknown structure